Yasuo Sone (born 9 March 1950) is a Japanese professional golfer.

Sone played on the Japan Golf Tour, winning once.

Professional wins (1)

Japan Golf Tour wins (1)

References

External links

Japanese male golfers
Japan Golf Tour golfers
1950 births
Living people